St Florian can refer to:

People 
Saint Florian (died ), patron saint of Linz, Austria; chimney sweeps; soapmakers; and firefighters
Florinus of Remüs (died 856), also known as Florian of Chur

Places 
St. Florian, Alabama, United States
Sankt Florian, Austria